Drew Dawit Desbordes (born September 12, 1994), known online under the name druski or drewski2funny, is an American internet personality. He is known for collaborating with various rappers in their music videos, like Jack Harlow, Drake, and others through various sketches.

Early life and education 
Desbordes was born on September 12, 1994, in Columbia, Maryland to Cheryl Desbordes, a state department worker, and David McLain Desbordes, a commercial pilot who previously served in the United States Air Force as a captain and in the National Guard as a Major. He grew up in Gwinnett County, Georgia alongside his sister, Nadia, who was born in 2006. He played sports as a child and mostly stayed out of trouble, except in the classroom when he would make jokes. He attended South Gwinnett High School.

Desbordes graduated high school due to his Spanish teacher, Nancy Gordeuk, giving him a simple paper to complete that awarded two-years worth of the class, meaning he could graduate on time. He then attended Georgia Gwinnett College before transferring to Georgia Southern University, with his mother paying rent. He became depressed and stopped attending classes, instead watching YouTube videos. After two semesters, he dropped out, disappointing his mother and having his grandmother threatening to cut him off. Desbordes originally wanted to become a sportscaster, but later turned to comedy after being encouraged by his classmates.

Career 
In late 2017, Desbordes began posting comedic skits and other comedic content on his Instagram account under the handle "druski2funny"

On March 9, 2020, he was featured on Lil Yachty's song "Oprah's Bank Account." On August 13, 2020, Desbordes was featured in the music video of Drake's song "Laugh Now Cry Later" featuring Lil Durk. On October 22, 2020, he was featured in Jack Harlow's song "Tyler Herro."

In 2021, Revolt and Adidas announced a new series called Sneakin’ In With Druski, with Desbordes as the host. The series has featured people like Snoop Dogg, Teyana Taylor, Yung Miami since its launch. That same year, Desbordes created the satirical label Coulda Been Records as a way for artists to come onto his Instagram Lives, usually resulting in him teasing them throughout their time on. Druski was an opening act for J. Cole and 21 Savage's The Off-Season Tour throughout September and October 2021. Also in October, Desbordes satirically offered Meek Mill to sign onto Coulda Been Records after Meek Mill said that he didn't get paid for his music.

Videography

References 

1994 births
Comedians from Maryland
Comedians from Georgia (U.S. state)
African-American male comedians
American male comedians
Living people